The eighth edition of the Queen Elisabeth Music Competition took place in 1957 and was the second one devoted to composition. A specific format in two categories was implanted, and Polish composer Michał Spisak, who had won the inaugural edition, successfully defended the title in the chamber orchestra category.

Palmares

Jury

  Jean Absil
  Tony Aubin
  Raymond Chevreuille
  Marcel Cuvalier (secretary)
  Óscar Esplá
  Karl Amadeus Hartmann
  Guillaume Landré
  Vic Legley
  Gian Francesco Malipiero
   Nicolas Nabokov
  Robert Oboussier
  Marcel Poot
  Francis Poulenc
  Virgil Thomson

References
   Queen Elisabeth Music Competition

08
1957 in Belgium